Malvoi is a village in Tiruchirapalli district, Tamil Nadu, India. It is 40 kilometers from the district’s headquarters, Tiruchirapalli bordered by Melarasur village.

Malvoi is known for its Kumbhabhishekam, a Hindu ritual that takes place in the village every 25 years. The festival, which draws people from surrounding villages and the capital city of Chennai, takes place at the Boomi Baalan temple. 
Villages in Tiruchirappalli district